The Rangiya - Rangapara North Passenger is a passenger train belonging to Northeast Frontier Railway that runs between Rangiya Junction and Rangapara North Junction. It is currently being operated with 55893/55894 train numbers on a daily basis.

Service 
The 55893/Rangiya - Rangapara North Passenger runs with an average speed of 41 km/h and completes 123 km in 3h. The 55894/Rangapara North - Rangiya Passenger runs with an average speed of 45 km/h and completes 126 km in 2h 45m.

Route and halts 
The important halts of the train are:

Coach composite 
The train has standard ICF rakes with max speed of 110 kmph. The train consists of 10 coaches:

 8 General Unreserved
 2 Seating cum Luggage Rake

Traction
Both trains are hauled by a Siliguri Loco Shed based WDP-4D diesel locomotive from Rangiya to Rangapara and vice versa.

Rake Sharing 
The train shares its rake with 55895/55896 Rangiya - Murkongselek Passenger.

See also 
 Rangiya Junction railway station
 Rangapara North Junction railway station
 Rangiya - Murkongselek Passenger

Notes

References

External links 
 55893/Rangiya - Rangapara North Passenger
 55894/Rangapara North - Rangiya Passenger

Rail transport in Assam
Slow and fast passenger trains in India
Railway services introduced in 2016